Sons of Satan Praise the Lord is a compilation album by Swedish death metal band  Entombed. It contains most of the studio covers that the band has ever performed on a double disc compilation (Hey On Glue's 'Sentimental Funeral' from the Black Juju EP is not included).

Track listing

Disc one

Disc two

References

Entombed (band) albums
2002 compilation albums